Deula ( deuḷa) is an architectural element in a Hindu temple in the Kalinga architecture style of the Odishan temples in Eastern India. Sometimes the whole temple is also referred to as Deula. The word "deula" in Odia language means a building structure built with a particular style that is seen in most of the temples from Odisha. Deul is also used in English, though the deul temples are also of a different form in the Manbhum region of Western Bengal.

There are three types of Deulas:  In terms of the general north Indian terminology, the Rekha Deula (rekha deul) is the sanctuary and the tower over it, respectively the garbhagriha and the shikhara, the Pidha Deula (pida deul) is the mandapa where the faithful are present.  The Khakhara deula is an alternative form of tower over the sanctuary, which in shape resembles the oblong gopuram temple gatehouses in southern Dravidian architecture.

Rekha Deula 

Rekha in Odia means a straight line. It is a tall building with a shape of sugar loaf, looking like a Shikhara. It covers and protects the sanctum sanctorum (Garbhagriha).
Examples :
 The Shikhara of the Lingaraja Temple in Bhubaneswar
 The Shikhara of the Jagannath temple in Puri
 Jagannath Temple in Nayagarh
 Uttaresvara Siva Temple in Bhubaneswar
 The Shikhara of Yameshwar Temple in Bhubaneswar
 The Shikhara  of the Shantinath Shiva Temple at Shihar village near Jayrambati, Bankura, West Bengal

Pidha Deula 

It is a square building, typically with a pyramid-shaped roof, rather like the vimana towers over the sanctuaries of temples in southern Dravidian architecture. For the halls or service rooms of the temple.
Examples
 The jaga mohan (assembly hall) of the Sun temple in Konârak
 The jaga mohan of Yameshwar Temple in Bhubaneswar
The jaga mohan  of the Shantinath Shiva Temple in Jayrambati, Bankura, West Bengal
 Digambara Jaina Temple, Khandagiri in Bhubaneswar

Khakhara deula 

Khakara deula is a rectangular building with a truncated pyramid-shaped roof, like the gopuras. The name comes from Khakharu (gourd) because of the shape of the roof. The temples of the feminine deities as Shakti are temple of that type.
Examples :
 Baitala Deula, Bhubaneswar (dedicated to Chamunda)
 Varahi Deula, Chaurasi, Puri district (dedicated to Varahi)
 Brahmi temple, Chaurasi
 Kedar Gouri, Bhubaneswar
 Narayani Temple, Khalikote (dedicated to Durga)
 Durga Temple, Banki

References

External links
 http://orissa.gov.in/e-magazine/Orissareview/nov2005/engpdf/Orissan_Temple_Architecture.pdf
 http://www.indoarch.org/arch_glossary.php

Hindu temple architecture
Architectural elements
Monuments and memorials in India
Indian architectural styles
Cultural history of Odisha